Calyptrocalyx hollrungii is a palm species in the family Arecaceae, and is native to Papua New Guinea and to the Indonesian part of New Guinea, Western New Guinea.

Taxonomy
Calyptrocalyx hollrungii was first described in 1889 by Odoardo Beccari as Linospadix hollrungii, with the species epithet, hollrungii, chosen to honour Max Hollrung. It was assigned to the genus, Calyptrocalyx, in 2001by John Dowe  and Michael Ferrero in 2001.

References

External links
Calyptrocalyx hollrungii at PalmWeb

hollrungii
Flora of New Guinea
Plants described in 1889
Taxa named by Odoardo Beccari